Isak Otto Andersson (10 April 1881 in Munsala – 16 September 1925) was a Finnish farmer and politician. He was a member of the Parliament of Finland from 1919 to 1922, representing the Social Democratic Party of Finland (SDP).

References

1881 births
1925 deaths
People from Nykarleby
People from Vaasa Province (Grand Duchy of Finland)
Social Democratic Party of Finland politicians
Members of the Parliament of Finland (1919–22)